The 2011 UTEP Miners football team represented the University of Texas at El Paso in the 2011 NCAA Division I FBS football season. The team's head coach was Mike Price, who served his eighth season at the post. The Miners played their home games at the Sun Bowl Stadium and were members of Conference USA in the West Division. They finished the season 5–7, 2–6 in C-USA to place fifth in the West Division. UTEP averaged 26,498 fans per game.

Schedule

References

UTEP
UTEP Miners football seasons
UTEP Miners football